Belemnite Point is the eastern extremity of a mainly ice-free, hook-shaped ridge, midway between Lamina Peak and Ablation Point and  inland from George VI Sound on the east coast of Alexander Island, Antarctica. It was first photographed from the air on November 23, 1935, by Lincoln Ellsworth and mapped from these photos by W.L.G. Joerg. Roughly surveyed in 1936 by the British Graham Land Expedition and resurveyed in 1949 by the Falkland Islands Dependencies Survey (FIDS), it was so named by FIDS because of belemnite fossils found there.

See also 
Ethelbald Bluff

References 

Headlands of Alexander Island